The 1918 Copa Ibarguren was the sixth edition of the national cup of Argentina. It was played by the champions of the two leagues, Primera División and Liga Rosarina de Football in 1918.

Racing (Primera División champion) faced Newell's Old Boys (Liga Rosarina champion) in a match in Gimnasia y Esgrima Stadium in Palermo, on November 24, 1918. Racing won 4–0 achieving its fifth Ibarguren trophy in six years.

Qualified teams 

Note

Match details

References

Rosario Central matches
Newell's Old Boys matches
1918 in Argentine football
1918 in South American football
Football in Buenos Aires